Larisa Mikhalchenko (born 16 February 1963) is a Ukrainian former discus thrower. Her personal best throw is 70.80 metres, achieved in June 1988 in Kharkov. She was born in Lviv, Ukrainian SSR.

International competitions

References

External links
 
 
 

1963 births
Living people
Sportspeople from Lviv
Soviet female discus throwers
Ukrainian female discus throwers
Athletes (track and field) at the 1988 Summer Olympics
Olympic athletes of the Soviet Union
World Athletics Championships medalists
Soviet Athletics Championships winners